Lt-Colonel Earl Ervin Clark (3 July 1919 – 28 December 2014) was an American soldier, an officer in the US Army's 10th Mountain Division during World War II, and helped to create the skiing industry in the US.

References

1919 births
2014 deaths
United States Army personnel of World War II